The Journal of Neural Transmission is a monthly peer-reviewed medical journal covering clinical neurology and translational neuroscience. It was established in 1950 by Carmen Coronini and Alexander Sturm as Acta Neurovegetativa. It was renamed to the Journal of Neuro-Visceral Relations in 1968 and to its current title in 1972. From 1989 to 1995, the journal was published in two sections: a "general section" and a "Parkinson's disease and dementia section." The editor-in-chief is Peter Riederer. According to the Journal Citation Reports, the journal has a 2019 impact factor of 3.505.

References

External links

Neurology journals
Publications established in 1950
Monthly journals
Springer Science+Business Media academic journals
English-language journals